A Truly Western Experience is the debut album by k.d. lang and the Reclines, released in 1984.

The album was re-released in February 2010, with bonus tracks and a DVD with rare videos.

Track listing
"Bopalena" (Webb Pierce, Mel Tillis) – 2:30
"Pine and Stew" (lang) – 3:25
"Up to Me" (Stewart MacDougall) – 3:06
"Tickled Pink" (Dave Bjarnason, lang, Stewart MacDougall, Gordie Matthews, Farley Scott) – 3:22
"Hanky Panky" (Dave Bjarnason, lang, Stewart MacDougall, Gordie Matthews, Farley Scott) – 1:59
"There You Go" (Durwood Haddock, Eddie Miller, W.S. Stevenson) – 2:23
"Busy Being Blue" (Stewart MacDougall) – 4:00
"Stop, Look and Listen" (George London, W.S. Stevenson)  – 2:13
"Hooked on Junk" (Edward Elgar) – 3:35

Personnel
k.d. lang – acoustic guitar, vocals, cover design
Dave Bjarnason – drums
Jamie Kidd – organ
Gary Koliger – steel guitar
Stewart MacDougall – piano, vocals
Gordie Matthews – guitar, slide guitar
Farley Scott – bass
Michael Shellard, Ian Oscar – backing vocals

Production
Producers: k.d. lang, Gaye Delorme, Jamie Kidd
Engineer: Jamie Kidd
Cover design: k.d. lang

References

K.d. lang albums
1984 debut albums